Djamalldine Bounou (born 15 April 1991) is a Comorian international footballer who plays for French club Consolat Marseille, as a centre back.

Career
Bounou has played for La Cayolle and Consolat Marseille.

He made his international debut for Comoros in 2014.

References

1991 births
Living people
French footballers
Comorian footballers
Comoros international footballers
Athlético Marseille players
Association football defenders